Marsh Creek is a  tributary of the Portneuf River in Bannock County, Idaho, United States.

Description
Beginning at an elevation of  near Red Rock Pass, Marsh Creek flows generally north near the communities of Downey and Arimo. It is roughly paralleled by Interstate 15/U.S. Route 91 in Idaho for most of its length.

See also

 List of rivers of Idaho
 List of longest streams of Idaho

References

Rivers of Idaho
Rivers of Bannock County, Idaho